KCIV (99.9 MHz) is an FM radio station licensed to Mount Bullion, California, and serving the Central Valley around Merced, California, with some coverage of Fresno.  The station airs a Christian talk and teaching radio format as an affiliate of the Bott Radio Network (based at KCCV-FM Kansas City).

KCIV has an effective radiated power (ERP) of 1,900 watts, broadcasting from a tower at 638.3 meters (2,094 feet) in height above average terrain (HAAT).  The transmitter is on Morrisey Lane in Mariposa, California.

History
On April 24, 1989, the station signed on the air. It has always been owned by the Bott Radio Network and has always had a Christian radio format.

References

External links

CIV
CIV
Moody Radio affiliate stations
Bott Radio Network stations